SEMC may refer to:

 ICAO airport code for Macas Airport in Macas, Ecuador
 Sawnee EMC, electrical cooperative in Cumming, Georgia, United States
 Sony Ericsson Mobile Communications AB, now called Sony Mobile
 Super Evil Megacorp, makers of the video game Vainglory